
Gmina Dolsk is an urban-rural gmina (administrative district) in Śrem County, Greater Poland Voivodeship, in west-central Poland.

Villages
Apart from the town of Dolsk, Gmina Dolsk contains the villages and settlements of Błażejewo, Brzednia, Brześnica, Drzonek, Gajewo, Gawrony, Kadzyń, Kotowo, Księginki, Lipówka, Lubiatówko, Lubiatowo, Małachowo, Maliny, Mały Trąbinek, Masłowo, Mełpin, Międzychód, Mszczyczyn, Nowieczek, Orliniec, Ostrowieczko, Ostrowieczno, Pinka, Pokrzywnica, Rusocin, Trąbinek and Wieszczyczyn.

Neighbouring gminas
Gmina Dolsk is bordered by the gminas of Borek Wielkopolski, Gostyń, Jaraczewo, Krzywiń, Książ Wielkopolski, Piaski and Śrem.

References
Polish official population figures 2006

Dolsk
Śrem County